New Reformation: Notes of a Neolithic Conservative is a 1970 book of social commentary by Paul Goodman best known as his apologia pro vita sua before his death two years later.

Synopsis 

Its first essay addresses misuse of scientific discovery by government. Contending that technology is a type of moral philosophy, not science, he advocates for technologists to advise on the proper use of technology and greater technological decentralization. He promotes reducing cars and encouraging space exploration. Goodman draws a final analogy between his contemporary times and the Protestant Reformation.

The book marked Goodman's schism from the countercultural student movement, which he saw as growing in ignorance and frail ideology, and who saw him as bourgeois.

Reception and legacy 

Writing in 2010, author Kerry Howley assessed Goodman's core distrust as having withstood the test of time (i.e., in CIA and FBI hidden government and in major political parties to protect civil liberties and not pursue war). She found his style to overprocess and sabotage ideas he intended to germinate, often extinguishing the joy out of otherwise interesting, subversive thoughts.

References

Bibliography

External links 

 

1970 non-fiction books
American non-fiction books
Books about anarchism
Books by Paul Goodman
English-language books
Random House books